Bullock Creek may refer to:

 Bullock Creek (New Zealand), a river valley in the Buller District of New Zealand
 Bullock Creek (Northern Territory), a fossil site in Australia
Bullock Creek (South Carolina), a stream in York County
Bullock Creek, South Carolina, an unincorporated community in York County